Laljiram Malviya is an Indian politician from Agar Malwa district in Madhya Pradesh state of Republic of India. He was a member of the Madhya Pradesh Legislative Assembly during 2008–2013 and was elected from Agar constituency. He is member of Bhartiya Janata Party.

References

Living people
People from Agar, Madhya Pradesh
Madhya Pradesh MLAs 2008–2013
Bharatiya Janata Party politicians from Madhya Pradesh
Year of birth missing (living people)